Twine is an online marketplace and network that connects creative freelancers in music, design and film to buyers. Twine rebranded from Clowdy in January 2016 with a marketplace focus.

Twine allows creative freelancers to tag collaborators on a creative project, enabling all those who worked on it to receive credit and build a portfolio. Twine also has portfolio feature that has no file upload limits and removes the common restriction of only allowing one media type on the site by encouraging quality creative content regardless of format. It has been described as the LinkedIn of the creative industries.

The site serves the same interface and platform for both of its users, namely artists (musicians, filmmakers, designers, animators), and buyers who commission the users services. Twine users can post project briefs that creatives can work on. They also can follow other users of the site and this forms the backbone of the sharing element of the site.

Twine's office is located in Manchester's Northern Quarter.

In July 2014, Twine, was voted as Winner of the UK Creative Business Cup.

References

External links
 

British music websites
British film websites
Online marketplaces of the United Kingdom
Companies based in Manchester